The Royal Commission into Mental Health Services, more commonly known as the Chelmsford Royal Commission (1988–1990), was a royal commission in the Australian state of New South Wales, chaired by Justice John Patrick Slattery. Established by the Government of New South Wales ostensibly to investigate mental health services in the state, the royal commission came about only after prominent Sydney radio and television shows pressured the newly elected Health Minister, Peter Collins, to make good his promises for a Royal Commission.

Originally, its prime focus was to have been psychosurgery at the NSW Neuropsychiatric Institute.  Following media pressure it focused more on the Deep Sleep Therapy of Dr Harry Bailey, the director, from 1963 to 1979, of the state-funded Neuropsychiatric Institute and then the Chelmsford Private Hospital, a private psychiatric institution in  Pennant Hills a suburb of Sydney. According to the National Institute of Health, "deep sleep was toxic coma for two to eight weeks in patients with intractable psychiatric conditions; about 40 deaths were associated with the treatment".

Background
Bailey committed suicide in September 1985 in response to the ongoing media exposure of his practices as well as disquiet from among the ranks of other health professionals. He wrote in his suicide note: "Let it be known that the Scientologists and the forces of madness have won". However, during his period of time being a Director of Chelmsford, there were serious allegations of cover up by colleagues and serious failings of the State to investigate.

The Royal Commission said in its 4000-page report that patients at Chelmsford received large doses of barbiturates which put them in comas for up to two weeks. Bailey described this mental state as a "holiday". He said that the drugs "have very beautiful chemicals that allows us to produce very stylish results in people’s mental functions". Bailey used Deep Sleep Therapy (DST) for a variety of conditions, both psychiatric and non-psychiatric. Patients were put to sleep in a short-term coma-like state for up to two weeks or longer. While the patients were supposed to be woken up for toileting and daily nursing care, they were kept unconscious for at least two weeks.

DST made its first appearance in the media in November 1967 in The Sydney Morning Herald. The newspaper reported concerns about the excessive amount of drugs given to Ronald Carter, who was then 23 years old. He died in May 1967 while under deep sleep therapy. The drugs used in deep sleep therapy include Tuinal, Neulactil, Sodium Amyta, Placidyl, and Serenace. All of these substances were restricted under Schedule 4 of the Poisons Advisory Committee. 25 patients died from Deep Sleep Therapy and hundreds suffered side effects. The Citizens Commission on Human Rights (CCHR) investigated Deep Sleep Therapy with an intense focus, leading to the Royal Commission. The practice is now outlawed in Australia.

Outcomes

The Royal Commission into Mental Health Services would expose the current bureaucracy and medical profession to scrutiny. It might "sheet home to doctors, public servants and the various medical boards the consequences of what at worst has been a cover-up, and at best has been an exercise in negligence and incompetence."The DST was Bailey's invention, a cocktail of barbiturates to put patients into a coma lasting up to 39 days, while also administering electro-convulsive therapy (ECT). Bailey likened the treatment to switching off a television; his self-developed theory was that the brain, by shutting down for an extended period, would "unlearn" habits that led to depression, addiction and other psychiatric conditions. Bailey claimed to have learnt DST from psychiatrists in Britain and Europe, though it was later found that only a mild variant was used there, sedating traumatised ex-soldiers for a few hours at a time, not the median 14 days under which Bailey and his colleague Dr John Herron subjected their 1,127 DST patients at Chelmsford between 1963 and 1979.

Approximately 24 patients died under care of Bailey, after being admitted for usually non-serious medical conditions (some within 4 days of being admitted), with 19 committing suicide within a year of treatment.A Victorian private psychiatric hospital which was associated with a quasi religious sect, Newhaven, "specialised in the use of LSD and psilocybin (magic mushrooms), Deep Sleep Therapy and ECT."

References

New South Wales royal commissions
Psychiatry controversies
Lobotomy
Physical psychiatric treatments
British human subject research
History of medicine in Australia